Door Mouse is a Canadian thriller film, directed by Avan Jogia and released in 2022. The film stars Hayley Law as Mouse, a dancer at a burlesque club owned by Mama (Famke Janssen), who begins to investigate the disappearance of her friend and colleague Doe-Eyes (Nhi Do) when she cannot convince Mama or the police to take the matter seriously. 

The cast also includes Jogia, Keith Powers, Donal Logue, Landon Liboiron, Elizabeth Saunders, Emma Campbell, Leo Choy, Michela Cannon, Gabriel Carter, Dylan Cook, Latoya Webb and Darren W. Marynuk.

The film was shot in spring 2021 in Sudbury, Ontario.

It was screened in the Industry Selects program at the 2022 Toronto International Film Festival, before premiering commercially on video on demand platforms in January 2023.

Awards

At the Vancouver Film Critics Circle Awards 2022, Law was nominated for Best Actress in a Canadian Film.

References

External links 
 

2023 films
2023 thriller films
English-language Canadian films
Canadian thriller films
2020s English-language films
2020s Canadian films
Films shot in Greater Sudbury